Strengthening Emergency Response Abilities (SERA) Project is a collaboration in Ethiopia between the Disaster Prevention and Preparedness Commission (DPPC), the United States Agency for International Development (USAID), and the regional state governments of Tigray, Amhara, Oromia and the Southern Nations, Nationalities and Peoples Region (SNNPR).

The project grant agreement between the US and Ethiopia (through the DPPC) for the SERA project was signed in 1997. It was intended to be a four-year project at a cost of $3.7 million, beginning in September 1997.

Since 1998, SERA has helped stakeholders understand better the underlying causes of disaster vulnerability. SERA does not implement mitigation activities. However SERA does contribute to a better understanding of a community's risk profile, and offers concrete proposals about how these risks can be reduced. SERA staff have prepared vulnerability profiles of selected woredas in each region. These diagnostic studies have helped woreda-level decision-makers, regional officials and federal analysts define actions that can contribute to the reduction of risks in these villages.

SERA has evolved into the "Emergency Preparedness Strengthening Program" (EPSP) which will help support the development of a national baseline to assist DPPC in its Early Warning activities.

References 

Charities based in Ethiopia
Emergency organizations
United States Agency for International Development